Cai or CAI may refer to:

Places
 Cai (state), a state in ancient China
 Caí River, Rio Grande do Sul, Brazil
 Cái River, Vietnam
 Cairo International Airport (IATA airport code)
 Caithness, a historic county in Scotland (Chapman code)

Organisations
 Canadian Airlines International, a defunct Canadian airline
 Capitol Archaeological Institute, an American archaeological research and education institute part of The George Washington University
 Central Asia Institute, a non-profit organization that promotes education in Central Asia
 Chartered Accountants Ireland, Ireland's largest accountancy body
 Christian Assemblies International, an Australian-based charity organisation and religious group
 Club Alpino Italiano, the Italian alpine club
 Coleraine Academical Institution, a school in Northern Ireland
 College of Anaesthesiologists of Ireland, a medical training body in Ireland
 Community Associations Institute, an influential trade association and special interest group
 Compagnia Aerea Italiana, parent company of Alitalia
 Corendon Airlines (ICAO airline code)
 Corpo Aereo Italiano, an element of the Italian Regia Aeronautica during the Battle of Britain
 WCAI, a group of NPR radio stations in Massachusetts that is part of the WGBH Educational Foundation

Science and technology
 Calcium-aluminium-rich inclusion, a type of mineral
 Carbonic anhydrase inhibitor, in pharmacology
 Codon Adaptation Index, a measure of codon bias in protein-coding DNA sequences
 Cold air intake, of an automobile
 Computer-aided inspection
 Computer assisted instruction or e-Learning
 Computer-assisted language learning
 Conodont Alteration Index, an estimate of the maximum temperature reached by a sedimentary rock
 Controlled Auto-Ignition, a technology of internal combustion for reciprocating engines

Sport
 Club Atletico Independiente de La Chorrera, a Panamanian football (soccer) team 
 Comisión de Actividades Infantiles, an Argentine football (soccer) team
 Club Atlético Independiente, an Argentine football (soccer) team

Other uses
 Cai (name), Welsh and alternative spelling of the name Kai.
 Cai (surname), a common Chinese surname
 Comprehensive Agreement on Investment, a proposed deal between China and the European Union
 Mesoamerican languages (ISO 639-2 and ISO 639-5 codes)
 Sir Kay, a character in Arthurian legend, spelt Cai in Welsh

See also
 Kai (disambiguation)
 CAIS (disambiguation)